Pareuchaetes is a genus of moths in the family Erebidae. The genus was erected by Augustus Radcliffe Grote in 1866.

Species
Pareuchaetes aurata (Butler, 1875)
Pareuchaetes bipunctata (Walker, 1855) 
Pareuchaetes arravaca (Jordan, 1916)
Pareuchaetes pseudoinsulata Rego Barros, 1956
Pareuchaetes insulata (Walker, 1855) – yellow-winged pareuchaetes moth
Pareuchaetes misantlensis Rego Barros, 1956

References

Phaegopterina
Moth genera